Jo Darr Gya Woh Marr Gya (Urdu: جو ڈر گیا وہ مر گیا) is a 1995 Pakistani suspense-crime thriller Urdu film. The film is an adaptation of the 1992 American thriller Consenting Adults, directed by Alan J. Pakula.

Cast
Neeli 
Javed Sheikh 
Atiqa Odho 
Reema Khan  
Nadeem 

The film was released in the summer of 1995 and earned major revenue for its production studio. It was directed by Iqbal Kashmiri.

Reception
The film did well at the box office by completing 66 weeks in theaters. Jo Darr Gaya Wo Mar Gaya was initially regarded as bold enough to be banned by some film critics. The film is an adaptation of the 1992 American thriller Consenting Adults, directed by Alan J. Pakula.

References

External links

1995 films
1990s Urdu-language films
Pakistani thriller films
Pakistani remakes of American films
Films scored by Nusrat Fateh Ali Khan
Films scored by Robin Ghosh
Urdu-language Pakistani films